Martin Georg Kocher (born 13 September 1973) is an Austrian economist, academic, and politician who has been minister of labour since January 2021 and minister of digital and economic affairs since 11 May 2022. He was a professor at the University of East Anglia before moving to the Ludwig Maximilian University of Munich and the University of Vienna. There he taught as a professor of behavioral economics and experimental economic research, and was also a visiting professor in Gothenburg and at the University of Queensland. His research interests are in Behavioral economics, Experimental economics, and Economic psychology.

References

Living people
University of Innsbruck alumni
Academics of the University of East Anglia
Academic staff of the Ludwig Maximilian University of Munich
Austrian politicians
People from Salzburg
1973 births